This is a list of newspapers in Paraguay.

Current newspapers  
ABC Color (Asunción)
El Debate (Asunción)
Democráticamente (Ciudad del Este)
DiarioCDE (Ciudad del Este)
ExtraPRESS (Asunción) 
La Hoja Digital (Pedro Juan Caballero)
Itacom (Encarnación)
Itapúa Hoy (Encarnación)
La Nación (Asunción)
Paraguay-Rundschau (Piribebuy) - in German
Popular (Asunción)
Tiempos del Mundo (Asunción)
Última Hora (Asunción)
Vanguardia (Ciudad del Este)
Wochenblatt (Asunción) - in German

Defunct Newspaper

See also
List of newspapers

Paraguay
Newspapers